Cecil Curnow was an Australian rules footballer who played in New Zealand for Waihi, whilst also representing the North Island, and also played in the South Australian Football League for , ,  and , also representing South Australia in interstate football.

References

Port Adelaide Football Club players (all competitions)
1887 births
Year of death missing
South Adelaide Football Club players
Sturt Football Club players
North Adelaide Football Club players